Riedenheim is a municipality in the district of Würzburg in Bavaria, Germany.

References

Würzburg (district)